Druitt is a British surname. It originates from the old French words and names dru (lover), Drue and/or Druet, and is related to the name Drew. Notable people with the surname include:

Cecil Druitt (1874–1921), Bishop of Grafton in Australia
George Druitt (1775–1842), Australian pioneer and soldier 
Montague Druitt (1857–1888), one of the suspects in the Jack the Ripper murders
Robert Druitt (1814–1883), British medical writer
Tobias Druitt, British author of fantasy novels

See also
Mount Druitt, suburb of Sydney, New South Wales, Australia

References